Numbskull may refer to:
"Numbskull" (song), a 1999 song by Ash
Numbskull – San Luis Obispo Ca 11/2/05, a 2006 rock album
 Numskull (born 1976), rapper from Oakland, California
 Numbskull Emptybrook, the main character of the Finnish comedy film Uuno Turhapuro and its sequels
 The Numskulls, a UK comic strip in The Beano